Please Sir! is a 1971 British comedy film directed by Mark Stuart and starring John Alderton, Deryck Guyler and Carol Hawkins. It is a spin-off from the ITV television series of the same name which ran from 1968 to 1972.

The film was shot at Pinewood Studios and on location in London in Primrose Hill and Willesden. The country park scenes were shot at Black Park, close to Pinewood in Buckinghamshire. Produced by L.W.I. Productions, it was released by the Rank Organisation on 10 September 1971.

Plot
Mr. Hedges, the somewhat naive and idealistic teacher of the rebellious Class 5C of Fenn Street School lobbies to have his class allowed on the annual school camping trip despite opposition from the head teacher Mr. Cromwell, the fastidious and officious school caretaker Mr. Potter, snobbish teacher Miss Ewell and the world-weary Mr. Price. Eventually (with Mr. Hedges having won the hearts and minds of Mr. Cromwell and Miss Ewell with a speech about giving Class 5C a helping hand with the benefits of the trip to the countryside) Class 5C get to go on the trip - providing Mr. Hedges comes along to supervise his unruly class.

Once on the camping trip Mr. Hedges pursues Penny Wheeler, a local part-time barmaid, and the class indulge in their usual activities, eg. Dennis relishes the clean air and rural surroundings and befriends a gypsy boy named Nobbler. Meanwhile 5c engage in a feud with stereotypical upper-class pupils from the posh Boulters School, which is resolved after a false rape allegation from Sharon. A case of stolen money is resolved through Mr. Hedges trusting the class. At the final dance Mr. Hedges is ensnared in the romantic clutches of teacher Miss Cutforth, contrary to his wishes.

Music
The film's closing theme - La La La Lu- was written by Mike Vickers and performed by Cilla Black. Black and her manager/husband Bobby Willis claimed they had been led to believe the song would open and close the film, but it was instead used over the final scenes of the pupils dancing and then partially over the closing credits. The planned release of the single was consequently abandoned by Black, who instead used the track as the 'B Side' of her single Something Tells Me (Something's Gonna Happen Tonight), which became her final top 10 single in the UK

Cast

 John Alderton as Bernard Hedges
 Deryck Guyler as Norman Potter
 Noel Howlett as Maurice Cromwell
 Joan Sanderson as Doris Ewell
 Richard Davies as Mr. Price
 Erik Chitty as Mr. Smith
 Patsy Rowlands as Angela Cutforth
 Peter Cleall as Eric Duffy
 Carol Hawkins as Sharon Eversleigh
 Liz Gebhardt as Maureen Bullock
 David Barry as Frankie Abbott
 Peter Denyer as Dennis Dunstable
 Malcolm McFee as Peter Craven
 Aziz Resham as Feisal
 Brinsley Forde as Wesley
 Jill Kerman as Penny Wheeler
 Norman Bird as Reynolds
 Barbara Mitchell as Mrs. Abbott
 Peter Bayliss as Mr. David Dunstable
 Eve Pearce as Mrs. Daphne Dunstable
 Jack Smethurst as Bus Driver
 Brenda Cowling as Mrs. Duffy

Reception
The film was one of the most popular movies of 1972 at the British box office.

References

External links
 

1971 films
1971 comedy films
British comedy films
Films based on television series
Films shot at Pinewood Studios
Films set in schools
Films shot in London
Films set in London
1970s English-language films
1970s British films